A Parc-aux-Cerfs ("park of stags"), in France, was generally the name given to the clearings that provided hunting fields for the French aristocracy prior to the French Revolution. The name is most notoriously known in history for an area in the grounds of the Palace of Versailles and a house there owned by Louis XV, where his secret mistresses were accommodated, being taken from there to the palace to visit the king. 

The house was small and discreet. According to the myth, the arrangement was supervised by the king's official mistress, Madame de Pompadour, who remained close to him, but no longer had a physical relationship with him. Nancy Mitford states in her Madame de Pompadour (1968 revised edition) that "[she] had nothing whatever to do with it".  The lovers were in fact recruited by the king's chamber servant, Dominique Guillaume Lebel.  

Between 1752 and 1768, many women and girls lived in the house, often more than one at a time, many of whom are unidentified. Among the famous lovers of the Parc-aux-Cerfs were Marie-Louise O'Murphy (in 1752–1755) with her sister Brigitte O'Murphy (1755–1757); Jeanne-Marguerite de Niquet "Mme Véron de Séranne" (1754); Marie Louise de Marny, Madame de Giambone (1758); Marguerite-Catherine Haynault (1759–1762); Lucie-Madeleine d'Estaing (1760–1763); Louise-Jeanne de Tiercelin de La Colleterie (1762–1765); Marie-Thérèse Boisselet (1768); Jeanne-Marguerite Salvetat "Madame Mars" (1768) and, finally Madame du Barry (1768). The house was sold in 1771.

References

French nobility
Louis XV
Versailles